Reyan is a vehicle manufacturing company is based in Tehran, Iran. It was established in 1995 to produce cars under license from Daewoo. It prodiced the Daewoo Cielo between 1996 and 2004 and the Daewoo Matiz from 2000 to 2004. In 2005, it became a partner of Hyundai, and now manufacture the Hyundai Avante and Hyundai Verna.

Motor vehicle manufacturers of Iran
Manufacturing companies based in Tehran
Vehicle manufacturing companies established in 1995